The Women's Rugby Super Series 2016 was the second of the Women's Rugby Super Series. It was contested by 2014 world champion England, runner-up Canada, France (who replaced New Zealand from the 2015 tournament) and United States. It was held in Salt Lake City, Utah, USA.

The tournament was won by Canada with England second, France third and USA last.

Table

Points scoring
4 points awarded for a win, 2 points for a draw, no points for a loss. 1 bonus point awarded for scoring four or more tries and 1 bonus point for losing by less than 7 points.

Fixtures and results

Day one

Day two

Day three

See also
Women's international rugby

References

Women's Rugby Super Series
International women's rugby union competitions hosted by the United States
2016 rugby union tournaments for national teams
2016 in women's rugby union
2016–17 in English rugby union
2016–17 in French rugby union
2016 in Canadian rugby union
2016 in American rugby union
2016 in English women's sport
2016 in French women's sport
2016 in Canadian women's sports
2016 in American women's sports